Goodenia macbarronii, commonly known as narrow goodenia, is a species of flowering plant in the family Goodeniaceae and is endemic to south-eastern Australia. It is an erect perennial herb with adventitious roots, toothed, lance-shaped leaves with the lower end towards the base, and racemes of yellow flowers.

Description

Taxonomy and naming
Goodenia macbarronii was first formally described in 1990 Roger Charles Carolin in the journal Telopea, from specimens collected by E.J. McBarron near Holbrook in 1947. The specific epithet (macbarronii) honours the collector of the type specimens.

Distribution and habitat
Narrow goodenia grows in damp places on the western slopes of the Great Dividing Range, between the Guyra and Inverell districts of New South Wales and the Wedderburn and Moyhu districts of northern Victoria.

References

macbarronii
Flora of Queensland
Flora of New South Wales
Flora of Victoria (Australia)
Plants described in 1990
Taxa named by Roger Charles Carolin
Endemic flora of Australia